St Andrews Burghs  was a district of burghs constituency, representing various burghs of Fife, Scotland, in the House of Commons of the Parliament of the United Kingdom, from 1832 to 1918.

Area covered
The constituency comprised the burghs of St Andrews, Anstruther Easter, Anstruther Wester, Crail, Cupar, Kilrenny and Pittenweem, all in the county of Fife. St Andrews and Cupar had previously been part of Perth Burghs, and the other burghs part of Anstruther Burghs.

In 1918 the constituency was abolished, and the burghs were thereafter represented as part of the East Fife constituency.

Members of Parliament

Election results

Elections in the 1830s

Elections in the 1840s

Elections in the 1850s

Elections in the 1860s

Elections in the 1870s

Elections in the 1880s 

The original count put the two 1885 candidates at 1,256 votes and, as the returning officer was not a constituent, he was unable to cast the deciding vote and declared both elected. After scrutiny, Anstruther gained two additional votes and lost one, while Williamson lost one also.

Elections in the 1890s

Elections in the 1900s

Elections in the 1910s 

General election 1914–15:

Another general election was required to take place before the end of 1915. The political parties had been making preparations for an election to take place and by the July 1914, the following candidates had been selected; 
Unionist: William Anstruther-Gray
Liberal: Henry Jackson

References 

Historic parliamentary constituencies in Scotland (Westminster)
Constituencies of the Parliament of the United Kingdom established in 1832
Constituencies of the Parliament of the United Kingdom disestablished in 1918
Politics of Fife